George Renny (18 August 1757 – 11 November 1848) was the president of the Royal College of Surgeons in Ireland (RCSI) in 1793.

Renny's medical education and degree were received in Edinburgh University; he entered the army as surgeon's mate in the 67th Regiment in 1775. In January, 1780, he was promoted to be surgeon in the 77th Regiment, which mutinied and was disbanded in 1783 in consequence of the Government deciding to send it to India, contrary to the express conditions under which the regiment was recruited. Immediately after this event Renny settled in Dublin and was later appointed Surgeon and Physician to the Royal Hospital, Kilmainham. As a Governor and a Commissioner of the Foundlings’ Hospital, he introduced a programme to treat venereal disease among the children admitted. Renny also served as Governor of Cork Street Fever Hospital and on a commission of inquiry into the House of Industry hospitals.   

Renny rendered valuable services to the  Royal College of Surgeons in Ireland, as it was mainly through his influence that the Government were persuaded to give liberal grants towards the expense of erecting new buildings in St. Stephen's Green. George Renny died on 11 November 1848, and was interred in the cemetery of the Royal Hospital. A tablet in memory of him was placed in Christ Church Cathedral soon after his death. The College paid for the tablet, and the Dean and Chapter remitted the fees usually charged for placing memorials in the Cathedral.

References

External links 

Presidents of the Royal College of Surgeons in Ireland
Scottish surgeons
1757 births
1848 deaths